Ebenezer Fuller Maitland FRS (23 April 1780 – 1 November 1858) was an English landowner and politician.

Origins
Maitland was the only son of Ebenezer Maitland (1752-1834), a London businessman and Bank of England director, and his wife Mary, daughter of John Winter. In 1807 he changed his name to Ebenezer Fuller Maitland in accordance with the wishes of his wife's unmarried aunt, Sarah Fuller, who left him her fortune.

Career
In 1804 Maitland served as a lieutenant-colonel in the Reading Volunteers. He was appointed Sheriff of Berkshire for 1825–26 and Sheriff of Breconshire for 1831–32.

Fuller Maitland was a director of the South Sea Company from 1815 until his death and in 1829 was elected a Fellow of the Royal Society. As well as two large London houses, he owned country estates at Shinfield Park and Park Place in Berkshire, Stansted Mountfichet in Essex, Garth near Builth Wells in Breconshire, and High Barcaple in Kirkcudbrightshire.

He died at Brighton in Sussex.

Family
In 1800, aged 20, Maitland married Bethia (1781–1865), the only child and heiress of Joshua Ellis and his wife Esther, the only child to marry of the banker William Fuller, said to be one of the richest men in England. They had twelve children, of whom four sons and four daughters married. His eldest surviving son and heir was the art collector William Fuller Maitland, who was father of the MP and cricketer William Fuller-Maitland.

References

 

1780 births
1858 deaths
Members of the Parliament of the United Kingdom for constituencies in Cornwall
Members of the Parliament of the United Kingdom for English constituencies
UK MPs 1807–1812
UK MPs 1812–1818
UK MPs 1818–1820
UK MPs 1826–1830
High Sheriffs of Berkshire
High Sheriffs of Brecknockshire
Fellows of the Royal Society
People from Clapham
People from Shinfield
People from Remenham
Ebenezer